Mehmet Cesur (born March 24, 1982, in Ankara, Turkey) is a Turkish national goalball player of class B2 and Paralympian.

Sporting career
A member of Çankaya Belediyesi Görme Engelliler Sport Club, Mehmet Cesur played in Turkey's national team at the 2012 Summer Paralympics, which became bronze medalist.

Achievements

References

Living people
1982 births
Sportspeople from Ankara
Male goalball players
Turkish goalball players
Paralympic goalball players of Turkey
Goalball players at the 2012 Summer Paralympics
Visually impaired category Paralympic competitors
Turkish blind people
Paralympic bronze medalists for Turkey
Medalists at the 2012 Summer Paralympics
Paralympic medalists in goalball
Paralympic athletes with a vision impairment